Metropolis 2000: Scenes from New York is a VHS/DVD release by American progressive metal band Dream Theater. It was released on April 21, 2001 by Elektra Records. The live performance was the final concert of the US leg of the Metropolis 2000 tour at the Roseland Ballroom, New York City on August 30, 2000.

The VHS release of Metropolis 2000: Scenes from New York was heavily shortened and only contains the performance of Metropolis Pt. 2: Scenes from a Memory. The entire concert can only be found on CD on Live Scenes From New York.

Contents
 The live performance of their 1999 album, Metropolis Pt. 2: Scenes from a Memory, in its entirety.
 A feature-length commentary track by all five members of Dream Theater.
 Live performances of "A Mind Beside Itself", "Learning to Live" and "A Change of Seasons".
 A behind-the-scenes documentary.
 A photo gallery of the Metropolis 2000 world tour.´

Track listing

DVD Bonus Tracks

Mike Portnoy's collapse
Mike Portnoy collapsed after the show was over. The official statement on his FAQ reads: I collapsed due to over-exhaustion, dehydration, stress, too little food and nutrition, too many Red Bulls, etc. It took me several hours of throwing up, being wrapped in blankets and laying down before I was carried out of the venue hours after the show.

RIAA Certifications
These statistics were compiled from the RIAA certification online database.

Gold - November 8, 2002

References

2001 video albums
Dream Theater video albums
Live video albums
2001 live albums